Flag Officer Commanding Western Fleet (FOCWF) is the title of the Indian Navy Officer who commands the Western Fleet, headquartered in Mumbai, Maharashtra. The FOCWF is a two star admiral holding the rank of Rear Admiral. The appointment is considered to be an important and a coveted one. The Current FOCWF is Rear Admiral Vineet McCarty, who assumed office on 15 November 2022.

History
After the independence and the partition of India on 15 August 1947, the ships and personnel of the Royal Indian Navy were divided between the Dominion of India and the Dominion of Pakistan. The Chief of the Royal Indian Navy was designated Flag officer Commanding Royal Indian Navy (FOCRIN). Serving under him was the Commodore Commanding Indian Naval Squadron (COMINS), the precursor to the Fleet Commander. In 1951, the appointment was upgraded to Two-star rank and was designated Rear Admiral Commanding Indian Naval Squadron (RACINS). In 1952, with the increase in number of naval vessels, the appointment was designated Flag Officer (Flotillas) Indian Fleet (FOFIF) and Flag Officer Commanding Indian Fleet (FOCIF) in 1957.

With the establishment of the Eastern Naval Command on 1 March 1968, the Indian Fleet was renamed as the Western Fleet and the Commander was designated Flag Officer Commanding Western Fleet (FOCWF).

The designations over time:
 1947 - 1951 - Commodore Commanding Indian Naval Squadron (COMINS)
 1951 - 1952 - Rear Admiral Commanding Indian Naval Squadron (RACINS)
 1952 - 1957 - Flag Officer (Flotillas) Indian Fleet (FOFIF)
 1957 - 1968 - Flag Officer Commanding Indian Fleet (FOCIF)
 1968 – present - Flag Officer Commanding Western Fleet (FOCWF)

List of Commanders

See also
 Western Fleet
 Flag Officer Commanding Eastern Fleet

References

Indian Navy
Indian military appointments
Indian Navy appointments